Alfred Edward Morgans (17 February 1850 – 10 August 1933) was the fourth Premier of Western Australia, serving for just over a month, from 21 November to 23 December 1901.

Born in Wales, Morgans trained as an engineer, and supervised mining operations in the United Kingdom, Mexico, and Central America. He came to Western Australia in 1896, during the gold rush, and developed the Mount Morgans Gold Mine. Morgans was elected to the Legislative Assembly of Western Australia in 1897, representing the seat of Coolgardie. He was appointed premier in late 1901, as a compromise candidate to replace George Leake, but his government was brought down after only 32 days. Leake returned as premier, and Morgans left parliament in 1904, at the end of his term. His career in politics lasted just over seven years, the shortest of any Premier of Western Australia, and only Hal Colebatch served as premier for a shorter period.

Early life and career
Alf Morgans was born at Ochr Chwith Machen Lower, Machen, Monmouthshire in Wales on 17 February 1850.  He was educated at private schools and subsequently attended the Welsh School of Mines. After completing his studies, he was apprenticed to a mechanical engineering firm at Ebbw Vale.

On 19 March 1872, he married Fanny Ridler at Gloucester in England. In 1878, Morgans' employers sent him to Mexico to supervise their gold and silver mines. He worked in Central America for a period of 18 years, representing British investments in mining and railways, especially in Guatemala and Nicaragua, during which time he learned to speak Spanish fluently, and developed an interest in Aztec and Mayan archaeology and sent artefacts to British museums.

Morgans arrived at Albany, Western Australia on RMS Himalaya from London on 18 March 1896, as a representative of Morgans' Syndicate Ltd. to inspect mining properties for London-based investors seeking sound investment opportunities. He acquired numerous properties and mining interests throughout the state, including Westralia Mount Morgans, and he was generally considered to be a leading authority on mining investment.

Political career
On 4 May 1897, Morgans was elected to the Legislative Assembly seat of Coolgardie.

In parliament, he was a supporter of Premier Sir John Forrest.  After Forrest resigned from state politics, the former supporters of Forrest continued to work together; the group became known under the moniker of ministerialists.  In November 1901, the ministerialists defeated Premier George Leake on a no-confidence vote, and he was compelled to resign.  However, they were initially unable to agree on a nominee for premier, and when the governor invited Frederick Henry Piesse to form a government, he could not secure enough support.

The ministerialists eventually agreed on Morgans as a compromise candidate, and he took office as premier and colonial treasurer on 21 November 1901, despite having never previous held any ministerial office.

However, in the subsequent ministerial by-election 1, supporters of Leake stood against Morgans' newly appointed cabinet, and three of the six new ministers were defeated.  Morgans then asked Governor Lawley for a dissolution of the Assembly, but this was refused.  He resigned as premier on 23 December 1901, and Leake took office again, this time with clearly defined support. Morgans did not re-nominate at the subsequent election.

Later career
Alf Morgans' life after politics consisted of a number of consular appointments in Western Australia.  From 1910 to 1917, he was Austro-Hungarian Consul for Western Australia; in 1915 he was also Vice-Consul for Spain. In 1921 he was appointed Consular Agent at Perth and Fremantle for the United States of America, remaining in the position until 1930, when he resigned due to ill-health.

He died on 10 August 1933 at South Perth in Western Australia.

References

Notes
1. Until 1947, newly appointed ministers were required to resign and stand for re-election.

Sources

1850 births
1933 deaths
Members of the Western Australian Legislative Assembly
Western Australian local councillors
People from Machen
Premiers of Western Australia
Welsh politicians
Welsh emigrants to colonial Australia
People from Coolgardie, Western Australia
Treasurers of Western Australia